Gino is a 1993 Australian film, directed by Jackie McKimmie.

Plot

Gino Pallazetti is in love with Lucia Petri and his career as a stand-up comedian is about to take off.

Production
The film was financed by the Australian Film Commission and Film Finance Corporation. The film was never released theatrically. It was shot from 5 April to 16 May 1993.  This was New Zealand actor Bruno Lawrence's final film appearance; ill health forced him to bow out of a further motion picture, Cosi, with his part unfinished.

References

External links

1993 films
Australian drama films
Films scored by Roger Mason (musician)
Films about comedians
1990s English-language films
1990s Australian films